Common dart may refer to the following butterflies:

Andronymus caesar, of tropical Africa, also called the white dart
Andronymus neander, of tropical Africa, also called the nomad dart
Ocybadistes flavovittata, of Indonesia, Australia and Papua New Guinea, also called the narrow-brand grass-dart
Potanthus pseudomaesa, of India, also called the Indian dart or pseudomaesa dart